Zhou Zhixin (born August 1965) is a Chinese scientist and university administrator, an academician of the Chinese Academy of Sciences, and currently president of the Space Engineering University.

He is an alternate member of the 20th Central Committee of the Chinese Communist Party.

Biography
Zhou was born in Taihu County, Anhui, in August 1965. He attended Taihu High School. He graduated from the PLA Institute of Electronic Engineering before gaining a master's degree and a doctor's degree from the Harbin Institute of Technology.

Zhou became a researcher at the Beijing Institute of Remote Sensing Information in 1999, and finally becoming its director.

In November 2017, Zhou was appointed president of the newly founded Space Engineering University.

Honours and awards
 2008 State Technological Invention Award (Second Class) 
 2008 State Science and Technology Progress Award (First Class) for the space information direct support application test system
 2009 Science and Technology Innovation Award of Ho Leung Ho Lee Foundation
 2014 State Science and Technology Progress Award (SSpecial)
 7 December 2015 Member of the Chinese Academy of Sciences (CAS)

References

1965 births
Living people
People from Taihu County
Scientists from Anhui
Harbin Institute of Technology alumni
Members of the Chinese Academy of Sciences
People's Republic of China politicians from Anhui
Chinese Communist Party politicians from Anhui
Alternate members of the 20th Central Committee of the Chinese Communist Party